Sára Bejlek (born 31 January 2006) is a Czech tennis player.

Bejlek has career-high WTA rankings of No. 162 in singles, achieved on 30 January 2023, and 671 in doubles, set on 1 August 2022. She has won four ITF singles titles and one ITF doubles title.

Early life
Bejlek was born in Hrušovany nad Jevišovkou on 31 January 2006.

Junior career
Junior Grand Slam results - Singles:
 Australian Open: –
 French Open: SF (2022)
 Wimbledon: 2R (2021)
 US Open: –

Junior Grand Slam results - Doubles:
 Australian Open: –
 French Open: W (2022)
 Wimbledon: 2R (2021)
 US Open: –

Bejlek won the 2022 French Open in girl's doubles event, partnering with Lucie Havlíčková. In addition, she reached semifinal in singles.

Career overview

2021: First ITF title & top 500
In July, she won her first and biggest ITF Circuit title-to-date at the $60k ITS Cup in Olomouc, Czechia after recording a double bagel over Paula Ormaechea in the final. This result secured her an improvement of 557 positions to No. 447 in just one month, after making her WTA rankings debut.

2022: Grand Slam & top 200 debuts
In June, she won title at the $60k Česká Lípa, the Macha Lake Open defeating fellow Czech Jesika Malečková in the final. The following week, Bejlek made her WTA Tour-level qualifying debut at Wimbledon Championships, but lost in the first round to Emina Bektas. A month later, she defended her title at the ITS Cup, this time defeating Lina Gjorcheska in the final. She continued with making progress at the US Open with her major main-draw debut due to three wins in the qualifying. She was the youngest player in the 2022 US Open main draw, having been the youngest direct entrant to qualifying.

2023: Australian Open debut
At 16, as the second-youngest player in the top 200, she made her debut at the Australian Open.

Performance timelines

Singles
Current after the 2023 Australian Open.

ITF Circuit finals

Singles: 4 (4 titles)

Doubles: 1 (1 title)

Junior finals

Junior Grand Slam finals

Girls' doubles: 1 (title)

ITF Finals

Singles: 6 (2 titles, 4 runner-ups)

Doubles: 11 (9 titles, 2 runner-ups)

References

External links
 
 
 Official website

2006 births
Living people
Czech female tennis players
People from Znojmo District
Sportspeople from the South Moravian Region
Grand Slam (tennis) champions in girls' doubles
21st-century Czech women